"Have Yourself a Merry Little Christmas" is a 1943 song written by Hugh Martin and Ralph Blane.

Have Yourself a Merry Little Christmas may also refer to:

Have Yourself a Merry Little Christmas (album), by Kurt Nilsen, 2010
Have Yourself a Merry Little Christmas (EP), by Diana Krall, 1998

See also
A Merry Little Christmas (disambiguation)
Have Yourself a Meaty Little Christmas, a 2009 album by the cast of Aqua Teen Hunger Force
Have Yourself a Sweary Little Christmas, a 2010 comedy album by the Amateur Transplants